Flying High is a musical comedy with book by B. G. DeSylva, Lew Brown, and Jack McGowan, lyrics by B. G. DeSylva and Lew Brown, music by Ray Henderson.
 
Produced by George White, the Broadway production opened on March 3, 1930 at the Apollo Theatre for a total run of 355 performances. The cast included Oscar Shaw, Bert Lahr, and Kate Smith.

This was the last of the DeSylva, Brown and Henderson Broadway musicals.

Songs

Act I
 I'll Know Him
 Wasn't It Beautiful While It Lasted?
 Air Minded
 The First Time for Me
 Flying High
 Thank Your Father
 Happy Landing
 Good For You – Bad For Me
 Red Hot Chicago

Act II
 Rusty's Up in the Air
 Without Love
 Mrs. Krause's Blue-Eyed Baby Boy
 I'll Get My Man

See also
 Flying High (1931 film)

References

External links
 
 

1930 musicals
Broadway musicals
Aviation musicals